This is a list of equipment used by the Philippine Marine Corps, a unit under the Philippine Navy that specializes in amphibious warfare. The marine corps has made use of its existing equipment conduct its operations while modernization projects are underway. The Republic Act No. 7898 declares the policy of the State to modernize the military to a level where it can effectively and fully perform its constitutional mandate to uphold the sovereignty and preserve the patrimony of the republic. The law, as amended, has set conditions that should be satisfied when the defense department procures major equipment and weapon systems for the marine corps.

Armoured vehicles

Utility vehicles

Artillery

Aircraft

Watercraft

Infantry weapons

Anti-tank and assault weapons

Anti-aircraft weapons

Communication equipment

Night-vision equipment

Acquisition programs
The Philippine Marine Corps' modernization program, meaning its equipment and weapon system acquisitions, is managed by the Philippine Navy. This is because it is a unit under the Philippine Navy and not a main branch of the AFP.

See also

 List of active military aircraft of the Philippines
 List of equipment of the Philippine Army
 List of equipment of the Philippine Air Force
 List of equipment of the Philippine Navy

References

Weapons of the Philippine Army
Military equipment of the Philippines